Piaget SA is a Swiss luxury watchmaker and jeweller. Founded in 1874 by Georges Piaget in the village of La Côte-aux-Fées, Piaget is currently a subsidiary of the Swiss Richemont group.

Piaget was founded as a manufacturer of watch movements but began marketing its own line of watches in the 20th century.

History

Origins 
In 1874, Georges Edouard Piaget set up his first workshop on the family farm, situated in the small village of La Côte-aux-Fées in the Swiss Jura mountains. Situated in the Neuchâtel region, the company was dedicated to crafting pocket watches and high-precision clock movements.

In 1911, Timothée Piaget, the son of Georges Piaget, took over the family firm. The company's policy has been to be dedicated to the production of wristwatches ever since.

Registered Trademark 
Under the guidance of the founder's grandsons, Gérald and Valentin Piaget, the Piaget brand became a registered trademark in 1943. Since then, the manufacture at La Côte-aux-Fées has produced its own creations.

As a result of this expansion, the family business opened a new factory in 1945, again in La Côte-aux-Fées.

Ultra-thin movement and jewellery 
In 1957, the manufacture at La Côte-aux-Fées brought out the Calibre 9P, the first ultra-thin (2 mm), hand-wound mechanical movement.

Then, in 1960, the Piaget watchmakers developed the Calibre12P, the thinnest automatic movement in the world, with a thickness of 2.3 mm (made official by an entry in the Guinness Book of Records).

In addition to coin watches, ring watches, brooch watches and cufflink watches, Piaget created their first pieces of jewellery.

In 1957, the Emperador men's watch was launched and since its relaunch in 1999 has become one of the brand's emblematic models.

The company's expansion led to the opening of a new factory in Geneva, dedicated to jewellery and, in 1959, their first boutique.

In 2014, Piaget presented the Altiplano 900P. At 3.65 millimeters (around 1/8th of an inch) it is the world's thinnest hand-wound mechanical watch.

Rapid expansion 
In 1964, Piaget presented their first watches with dials worked in precious stones: lapis-lazuli, turquoise, onyx and tiger's eye. Piaget then launched the cuff watch. 1976 saw the launch of the Calibre 7P, a quartz movement, during the quartz crisis.

The Piaget Polo watch with its avant-garde style, was brought out in 1979 and became one of the brand's models. The Dancer collection was launched in 1986.

The company has been under the presidency of Yves Piaget since 1980.

Merger 
The luxury Vendôme group, now  Richemont, purchased the Piaget manufacture in 1988.

In the 1990s, several new collections were launched: Possession, Tanagra, Limelight and Miss Protocole with its interchangeable straps.

Piaget brought out the Altiplano watch and in 1999 reinvented one of their classics, the Emperador line.

Watchmaking was regrouped in one collection: Black Tie.

21st century 

In 2001, a Piaget Haute Horlogerie manufacture was opened in Plan-les-Ouates, just outside Geneva. The movements continued to be produced at La Côte-aux-Fées, the family's birthplace. The new building grouped together over 40 professions in the fields of watchmaking and jewellery.

The manufacture developed mechanical movements and in 2002 brought out the first Piaget Manufacture tourbillon movement, the Calibre 600P, the thinnest tourbillon in the world with 3.5 mm thickness.

In 2004, Piaget celebrated their 130th anniversary.

Watch and jewelry manufacturing

Ultra-thin movement 
The brand is one of the forerunners in the creation of ultra-thin movements with the manual 9P and automatic 12P movements, respectively the thinnest in their category in the world in 1957 and 1960. This has led in more recent years to the modern developments 430P, 450P and 438P, with a thickness of only 2.1 millimetres. These latest innovations are used in the Altiplano line, the most recent of which is the Altiplano 900P. At 3.65 millimeter it is the world's thinnest hand-wound mechanical watch.

Tourbillon movement 
The Tourbillon movement was developed over a period of three years.  Resulting from this research is the calibre 600P, the thinnest tourbillon movement in the world (3.5 mm). Its frame is composed of 42 minuscule parts, including three titanium bridges, it weighs just 0.2 grams. The flying tourbillon – mounted on a single axis – is topped by the initial “P”, which adds to the complexity of the poising.

Tourbillon skeleton movement 
Piaget's flying tourbillon movement is the thinnest of its kind in the world (3.5 mm). It is divided into segments corresponding to each of the 60 seconds, a sunburst guilloche decoration shines out from the tourbillon's frame. The model is in gold and set with precious stones.

Retrograde movement 
The Calibre 560P is a self-winding mechanical movement, designed, developed and built at the heart of Manufacture Piaget, and boasting a complex retrograde seconds mechanism.  The hand traces an arc from 0 to 30 at 12 o’clock, then jumps back to its starting point. The design of the handcrafted finishing details took 24 months: circular Côtes de Genève decoration, stippled main plate, bevelled and hand-drawn bridges as well as blued screws.

Self-winding movement 
A new generation of self-winding mechanical movements was launched in 2006. The 800P, with hours, minutes, central seconds hands and large date display, is equipped with two barrels, guaranteeing a power reserve of 72 hours. This 12-ligne calibre, beats at 21,600 vibrations per hour (3 hertz) and its timing is ensured by a screw-regulated balance. The 850P version displays small seconds and a second time zone on two sub-dials. A day/night indicator synchronised with the central time zone completes the display.

Art of enamelling 
Piaget continue the tradition of miniature painting thanks to a traditional technique. The enameller begins by crushing and cleaning raw enamels to obtain a very fine powder, which is then mixed with essential oils to achieve the colour palette. The enamel is applied with a brush in successive fine layers, each of which is oven-fired at temperatures exceeding 800 °C. Each enamelled piece requires nearly twenty firings in the oven. The enamel and its colours are then set forever.

Setting and gemmology 
Piaget owns the largest jewellery workshop in Geneva. Every stone is cut, adjusted and set by hand. The diamonds meet the highest standards of colour (D to G) and clarity (IF to VVS.) The diamonds are tested according to in-house guidelines based on their colour, size, clarity and carat.

Environmental rating 

In December 2018, World Wide Fund for Nature (WWF) released an official report giving environmental ratings for 15 major watch manufacturers and jewelers in Switzerland. Piaget was ranked No. 3 among the 15 manufacturers and, along with 3 other manufacturers including Vacheron Constantin and Jaeger-LeCoultre, was given an average environmental rating as "Upper Midfield", suggesting that the manufacturer has taken first actions addressing the impact of its manufacturing activities on the environment and climate change. According to Piaget's official document, the company is committed to "preserving natural resources and minimizing its environmental impact".

In jewelry and watchmaking industry, there are concerns over the lack of transparency in manufacturing activities and the sourcing of precious raw materials such as gold, which is a major cause of environmental issues such as pollution, soil degradation and deforestation. The situation is especially serious in the developing countries which are top producers of gold, including China, Russia and South Africa. It is estimated that the watch and jewelry sector uses over 50% of world's annual gold production (over 2,000 tons), but in most cases the watch companies are not able to or are unwilling to demonstrate where their raw materials come from and if the material suppliers use eco-friendly sourcing technologies.

Prizes and awards 
 In 2000, the jury of Montres Passion awarded the prize of “Watch of the Year” to the Emperador model.
 At the Geneva Watchmaking Grand Prix, the Piaget 1967 watch was awarded the “Design Watch Prize” in 2002 and the Altiplano XL watch won the “Ultra-Flat Watch Prize” in 2003.
 At the Geneva Watchmaking Grand Prix, Piaget were awarded the Ladies’  Jewellery Watch Prize in 2006, for their Limelight Party model.
 In 2006 the Limelight Party watch was also elected “Most beautiful watch of 2006” by the magazine Vogue Joyas Spain.
 The Piaget Polo Chronograph watch was elected “Watch of the Year 2007” in the Chronograph category by the jury of the French magazine La Revue des Montres.
 The Emperador model received the prize of Men's Watch of the Year 2007 (Middle East Watch of the Year Awards 2007), organised by the magazine Alam Assaat Wal Moujawharat.
 The Limelight Party Secret watch was named “Watch of the Year 2007” in the Ladies’ Watch category by the Belgian magazine Passion des Montres.

Piaget Best Jeweller Prize 
In 2005, Piaget created their Best Jeweller Prize. This prize is awarded to the most deserving student of the Certificat Fédéral de Capacité in watchmaking. Dorian Recordon was the first holder of the qualification to receive this prize.

See also 

 List of watch manufacturers

Further reading
 Art of Timeless Elegance

References

External links 

 

Richemont brands
Swiss watch brands
Design companies established in 1874
Manufacturing companies established in 1874
Watch manufacturing companies of Switzerland
Luxury brands
Swiss companies established in 1874